Events in the year 2023 in Burundi.

Incumbents 

 President: Évariste Ndayishimiye
 Prime Minister: Gervais Ndirakobuca

Events 
Ongoing — COVID-19 pandemic in Burundi

 25 January – Kirundi becomes an official language.

References 

 
2020s in Burundi
Years of the 21st century in Burundi
Burundi
Burundi